Evrytania is a constituency in Central Greece represented in the Hellenic Parliament. This constituency corresponds to Evrytania prefecture. It elects one Member of Parliament (MP) by the Reinforced proportional representation system of election.

Election results

Legislative election

Parliament members

Current members
 Konstantinos Kontogeorgos (New Democracy)

Members (Jan 2015 - Sep 2015)
 Thomas Kotsias (SYRIZA)

Notes and references

Parliamentary constituencies of Greece
Evrytania